Sirene was a Norwegian feminist magazine, issued from 1973 to 1983.

History and profile
Sirene was launched in 1973. One of the founders was Bjørg Vik. The magazine was published by the publishing house J.W. Cappelens Forlag from 1973 to 1976, and thereafter by a dedicated foundation. It had a circulation of 20,000 at its maximum in 1975.

In a thesis dated 1978 at the University of Oslo, Turid Kleiva described Sirene as a feminist alternative to the traditional weekly magazines. The magazine did not have a dedicated editor, but was produced collectively by a group of editors. The editorial staff included Bjørg Vik, Bitten Modal, Ida Lou Larsen and others. Sirene regular illustrators included Tonje Strøm. The magazine ended publication in 1983.

References

1973 establishments in Norway
1983 disestablishments in Norway
Defunct magazines published in Norway
Feminism in Norway
Feminist magazines
Magazines established in 1973
Magazines disestablished in 1983
Magazines published in Oslo
Monthly magazines published in Norway
Norwegian-language magazines
Women's magazines published in Norway